Rufus King Howell (1820 – October 4, 1890) was a justice of the Louisiana Supreme Court from April 3, 1865, to January 9, 1877.

In 1865, Howell was appointed by Governor James Madison Wells to the newly constituted post-Civil War court. Although he formally held his seat until January 1877, he did not participate in the last sitting of the court held in that month. The court was thereafter completely replaced by the new Democratic administration which took over the state government at that time.

He testified of the enmity felt towards the U.S. Government and Loyalists.

References

1820 births
1890 deaths
Justices of the Louisiana Supreme Court